Pterostylis platypetala, commonly known as the broad-petalled snail orchid, is a species of orchid endemic to the south-west of Western Australia. It has a rosette of leaves and when flowering, a single green and white flower with relatively wide petals. In ideal conditions it can form colonies of hundreds of plants and often grows under melaleucas on the edge of winter-wet areas.

Description
Pterostylis platypetala is a terrestrial, perennial, deciduous, herb with an underground tuber. It has a leaf rosette  in diameter. The dorsal sepal and petals are fused, forming a hood or "galea" over the column and the dorsal sepal tapers to a point. The petals are wider than those of similar greenhoods and extend beyond the end of the dorsal sepal. The labellum is small and not visible from outside the flower. Flowering occurs from May to July.

Taxonomy and naming
Pterostylis platypetala was first formally described in 2015 by David Jones and Christopher French from a specimen collected in the Wandoo National Park and the description was published in Australian Orchid Review. The specific epithet (platypetala) is derived from the Ancient Greek words πλατύς (platús) meaning “flat” and petalon meaning "petal", referring to the broad edges of the petals.

Distribution and habitat
The broad-petalled snail orchid grows in salmon gum and wandoo woodland and under melaleucas on the edge of winter-wet areas. It occurs between Kalbarri and Brookton.

Conservation
Pterostylis platypetala is listed as "not threatened" by the Government of Western Australia Department of Parks and Wildlife.

References

platypetala
Endemic orchids of Australia
Orchids of Western Australia
Plants described in 2015